The 2021 Davidson Wildcats football team represented Davidson College in the 2021 NCAA Division I FCS football season as a member of the Pioneer Football League. They 
were led by fourth-year head coach Scott Abell and played their home games at Richardson Stadium.

Schedule

References

Davidson
Davidson Wildcats football seasons
Pioneer Football League champion seasons
2021 NCAA Division I FCS playoff participants
Davidson Wildcats football